Saj (also Romanized as Sāj; also known as Sāch, Salj, and Sanj) is a village in Dodangeh-ye Sofla Rural District, Ziaabad District, Takestan County, Qazvin Province, Iran. At the 2006 census, its population was 733, in 213 families.

References 

Populated places in Takestan County